Zoumaping Township is an rural township in Sangzhi County, Zhangjiajie, Hunan Province, China.

Administrative division
The township is divided into 11 villages, the following areas: Liangchaxi Village, Guizhuya Village, Xiangjiaping Village, Tianhe Village, Longdongping Village, Gunshuiyu Village, Nanmu Village, Tangjiata Village, Zoumaping Village, Zhuojiayu Village, and Zhangjiaya Village (两岔溪村、贵竹垭村、向家坪村、天合村、龙洞坪村、滚水峪村、楠木村、唐家塔村、走马坪村、卓家峪村、张家亚村).

References

External links

Divisions of Sangzhi County
Ethnic townships of the People's Republic of China